SS-101 or SS 101 may refer to:

 SS Heavy Panzer Battalion 101, a unit of the German Army 
 USS R-24 (SS-101), a United States Navy submarine which saw service during World War I